The 2014 Colorado Rockies season was the franchise's 22nd in Major League Baseball. Beset by injuries to key players, the team finished with a  66–96 regular season record, fourth place in the National League West. Walt Weiss returned for his second season as the Rockies' manager for the 2014 season.

Offseason

Roster moves
November 21, 2013: LaTroy Hawkins was signed as a free agent by the Colorado Rockies.
December 3, 2013: Dexter Fowler was traded by the Colorado Rockies with a player to be named later to the Houston Astros for Brandon Barnes and Jordan Lyles.
December 10, 2013: Brett Anderson was traded by the Oakland Athletics to the Colorado Rockies for Drew Pomeranz and Chris Jensen (minors).
December 12, 2013: Tommy Kahnle was drafted by the Colorado Rockies from the New York Yankees in the 2013 Rule 5 draft.
December 13, 2013: Justin Morneau was signed as a free agent by the Colorado Rockies.
December 16, 2013: Boone Logan was signed as a free agent by the Colorado Rockies.
December 18, 2013: Jonathan Herrera was traded by the Colorado Rockies to the Boston Red Sox for Franklin Morales and Chris Martin.
December 18, 2013: Josh Outman was traded by the Colorado Rockies to the Cleveland Indians for Drew Stubbs.

Spring training
The Rockies played their spring training games in the Cactus League. They finished with a 15–14 win–loss record, which does not include 4 tie games.

Regular season

Season standings

National League West

National League Wild Card

Record vs. opponents

Transactions
June 12, 2014: Jordan Pacheco was selected off waivers by the Arizona Diamondbacks from the Colorado Rockies.
July 2, 2014: Jair Jurrjens was traded by the Cincinnati Reds to the Colorado Rockies for Harold Riggins (minors).
August 2, 2014: Ryan Wheeler was selected off waivers by the Los Angeles Angels of Anaheim from the Colorado Rockies.

Major League Debuts
Batters
Kyle Parker (Jun 16)
Ben Paulsen (Jul 21)
Cristhian Adames (Jul 29)
Jackson Williams (Aug 27)
Rafael Ynoa (Sep 1)
Pitchers
Tommy Kahnle (Apr 3)
Chris Martin (Apr 26)
Eddie Butler (Jun 6)
Christian Bergman (Jun 9)
Tyler Matzek (Jun 11)
Yohan Flande (Jun 25)
Brooks Brown (Jul 6)

Roster

Game log 

|-  bgcolor="ffbbbb"
|- align="center" bgcolor="ffbbbb"
| 1 || March 31 || @ Marlins || 10–1 || Fernández (1–0) || de la Rosa (0–1) || || 37,116 || 0–1
|-

|-  bgcolor="ffbbbb"
|- align="center" bgcolor="ffbbbb"
| 2 || April 1 || @ Marlins || 4–3 || Eovaldi (1–0) || Anderson (0–1)  || Cishek (1) || 15,906 || 0–2
|- align="center" bgcolor="bbffbb"
| 3 || April 2 || @ Marlins || 6–5 || Lyles (1–0) || Álvarez (0–1) || Hawkins (1) || 15,866 || 1–2
|- align="center" bgcolor="ffbbbb"
| 4 || April 3 || @ Marlins || 8–5 || Ramos (1–0) || Belisle (0–1) || Cishek (2) || 15,378 || 1–3
|- align="center" bgcolor="bbffbb"
| 5 || April 4 || Diamondbacks || 12–2 || Nicasio (1–0) || Delgado (0–1) || || 49,130 || 2–3
|- align="center" bgcolor="bbffbb"
| 6 || April 5 || Diamondbacks || 9–4 || Kahnle (1–0) || McCarthy (0–1) || || 34,407 || 3–3
|- align="center" bgcolor="ffbbbb"
| 7 || April 6 || Diamondbacks || 5–3 || Miley (2–1) || Anderson (0–2) || Reed (2) || 29,779 || 3–4
|- align="center" bgcolor="bbffbb"
| 8 || April 7 || White Sox || 8–1 || Lyles (2–0) || Paulino (0–1) || || 22,550 || 4–4
|- align="center" bgcolor="ffbbbb"
| 9 || April 8 || White Sox || 15–3 || Quintana (1–0) || Morales (0–1) || || 25,393 || 4–5
|- align="center" bgcolor="bbffbb"
| 10 || April 9 || White Sox || 10–4 || Brothers (1–0) || Downs (0–2) || || 22,745 || 5–5
|- align="center" bgcolor="ffbbbb"
| 11 || April 11 || @ Giants || 6–5 || Bumgarner (2–0) || de la Rosa (0–2) || Romo (3) || 41,707 || 5–6
|- align="center" bgcolor="bbffbb"
| 12 || April 12 || @ Giants || 1–0 || Kahnle (2–0) || Cain (0–2) || Hawkins (2) || 41,917 || 6–6
|- align="center" bgcolor="ffbbbb"
| 13 || April 13 || @ Giants || 5–4 (10) || Romo (1–0) || Brothers (1–1) || || 41,490 || 6–7
|- align="center" bgcolor="ffbbbb"
| 14 || April 14 || @ Padres || 5–4 || Thayer (2–0) || Brothers (1–2) || Street (4) || 14,784 || 6–8
|- align="center" bgcolor="bbffbb"
| 15 || April 15 || @ Padres || 3–2 || Nicasio (2–0) || Erlin (1–1) || Hawkins (3) || 18,012 || 7–8
|- align="center" bgcolor="ffbbbb"
| 16 || April 16 || @ Padres || 4–2 || Cashner (2–1) || de la Rosa (0–3) || Street (5) || 17,428 || 7–9
|- align="center" bgcolor="bbffbb"
| 17 || April 17 || @ Padres || 3–1 || Morales (1–1) || Kennedy (1–3) || Hawkins (4) || 17,557 || 8–9
|- align="center" bgcolor="bbffbb"
| 18 || April 18 || Phillies || 12–1 || Chatwood (1–0) || Pettibone (0–1) || || 35,705 || 9–9
|- align="center" bgcolor="bbffbb"
| 19 || April 19 || Phillies || 3–1 || Lyles (3–0) || Kendrick (0–2) || Hawkins (5) || 31,352 || 10–9
|- align="center" bgcolor="ffbbbb"
| 20 || April 20 || Phillies || 10–9 || Diekman (2–1) || Belisle (0–2) || Papelbon (5) || 33,563 || 10–10
|- align="center" bgcolor="bbffbb"
| 21 || April 21 || Giants || 8–2 || de la Rosa (1–3) || Vogelsong (0–1) || || 25,434 || 11–10
|- align="center" bgcolor="bbffbb"
| 22 || April 22 || Giants || 2–1 || Morales (2–1) || Bumgarner (2–2) || Hawkins (6) || 27,165 || 12–10
|- align="center" bgcolor="ffbbbb"
| 23 || April 23 || Giants || 12–10 (11) || Machi (4–0) || Bettis (0–1) || || 35,191 || 12–11
|- align="center" bgcolor="bbffbb"
| 24 || April 25 || @ Dodgers || 5–4 (11) || Brothers (2–2) || Wright (1–1) || Hawkins (7) || 44,866 || 13–11
|- align="center" bgcolor="ffbbbb"
| 25 || April 26 || @ Dodgers || 6–3 || Maholm (1–2) || Nicasio (2–1) || Jansen (9) || 45,241 || 13–12
|- align="center" bgcolor="bbffbb"
| 26 || April 27 || @ Dodgers || 6–1 || de la Rosa (2–3) || Ryu (3–2) || || 52,359 || 14–12
|- align="center" bgcolor="bbffbb"
| 27 || April 28 || @ Diamondbacks || 8–5 || Morales (3–1) || Miley (2–3) || Hawkins (8) || 17,127 || 15–12
|- align="center" bgcolor="bbffbb"
| 28 || April 29 || @ Diamondbacks || 5–4 || Logan (1–0) || Reed (0–2) || Hawkins (9) || 19,702 || 16–12
|- align="center" bgcolor="ffbbbb"
| 29 || April 30 || @ Diamondbacks || 5–4 (10) || Reed (1–1) || Kahnle (2–1) || || 19,135 || 16–13
|-

|-  bgcolor="ffbbbb"
|- align="center" bgcolor="bbffbb"
| 30 || May 1 || Mets || 7–4 || Nicasio (3–1) || Colón (2–4) || || 22,989 || 17–13
|- align="center" bgcolor="bbffbb"
| 31 || May 2 || Mets || 10–3 || de la Rosa (3–3) || Wheeler (1–3) || || 42,040 || 18–13
|- align="center" bgcolor="bbffbb"
| 32 || May 3 || Mets || 11–10 || Hawkins (1–0) || Farnsworth (0–2) || || 38,688 || 19–13
|- align="center" bgcolor="ffbbbb"
| 33 || May 4 || Mets || 5–1 || Gee (3–1) || Chacín (0–1) || || 40,190 || 19–14
|- align="center" bgcolor="bbffbb"
| 34 || May 5 || Rangers || 8–2 || Lyles (4–0) || Pérez (4–2) || || 26,242 || 20–14
|- align="center" bgcolor="bbffbb"
| 35 || May 6 || Rangers || 12–1 || Nicasio (4–1) || Ross, Jr. (1–3) || || 27,838 || 21–14
|- align="center" bgcolor="bbffbb"
| 36 || May 7 || @ Rangers || 9–2 || de la Rosa (4–3) || Lewis (2–2) || || 29,467 || 22–14
|- align="center" bgcolor="ffbbbb"
| 37 || May 8 || @ Rangers || 5–0 || Harrison (1–0) || Morales (3–2) || || 27,617 || 22–15
|- align="center" bgcolor="ffbbbb"
| 38 || May 9 || @ Reds || 4–3 || Broxton (1–0) || Logan (1–1) || || 27,187 || 22–16
|- align="center" bgcolor="bbffbb"
| 39 || May 10 || @ Reds || 11–2 || Lyles (5–0) || Simón (4–2) || || 37,984 || 23–16
|- align="center" bgcolor="ffbbbb"
| 40 || May 11 || @ Reds || 4–1 || Bailey (3–2) || Nicasio (4–2) || Chapman (1) || 33,143 || 23–17
|- align="center" bgcolor="ffbbbb"
| 41 || May 13 || @ Royals || 5–1 || Shields (5–3) || Morales (3–3) || || 15,914 || 23–18
|- align="center" bgcolor="ffbbbb"
| 42 || May 14 || @ Royals || 3–2 || Vargas (4–1) || Chacín (0–2) || Holland (10) || 27,323 || 23–19
|- align="center" bgcolor="bbffbb"
| 43 || May 16 || Padres || 3–1 || de la Rosa (5–3) || Stults (2–4) || Hawkins (10) || 35,384 || 24–19
|- align="center" bgcolor="ffbbbb"
| 44 || May 17 || Padres || 8–5 || Erlin (3–4) || Lyles (5–1) || Street (13) || 40,508 || 24–20
|- align="center" bgcolor="bbffbb"
| 45 || May 18 || Padres || 8–6 (10) || Masset (1–0) || Thayer (2–2) || || 44,092 || 25–20
|- align="center" bgcolor="bbffbb"
| 46 || May 20 || Giants || 5–4 || Hawkins (2–0) || Romo (3–1) || || 31,046 || 26–20
|- align="center" bgcolor="ffbbbb"
| 47 || May 21 || Giants || 5–1 || Petit (3–1) || Chacín (0–3) || || 30,411 || 26–21
|- align="center" bgcolor="bbbbbb"
| – || May 22 || Giants || colspan=6 | Suspended (rain) Rescheduled for September 1
|- align="center" bgcolor="ffbbbb"
| 48 || May 23 || @ Braves || 3–2 || Carpenter (4–0) || Ottavino (0–1) || Kimbrel (13) || 25,646 || 26–22
|- align="center" bgcolor="bbffbb"
| 49 || May 24 || @ Braves || 3–1 || Nicasio (5–2) || Minor (2–3) || Hawkins (11) || 26,741 || 27–22
|- align="center" bgcolor="ffbbbb"
| 50 || May 25 || @ Braves || 7–0 || Teherán (4–3) || Morales (3–4) || || 35,565 || 27–23
|- align="center" bgcolor="ffbbbb"
| 51 || May 26 || @ Phillies || 9–0 || Kendrick (1–5) || Chacín (0–4) || || 27,289 || 27–24
|- align="center" bgcolor="bbffbb"
| 52 || May 27 || @ Phillies || 6–2 || de la Rosa (6–3) || Hamels (1–3) || || 23,159 || 28–24
|- align="center" bgcolor="ffbbbb"
| 53 || May 28 || @ Phillies || 6–3 || Papelbon (1–1) || Hawkins (2–1) || || 23,691 || 28–25
|- align="center" bgcolor="ffbbbb"
| 54 || May 30 || @ Indians || 5–2 || Kluber (6–3) || Nicasio (5–3) || Allen (2) || 25,066 || 28–26
|- align="center" bgcolor="ffbbbb"
| 55 || May 31 || @ Indians || 7–6 || Shaw (2–1) || Brothers (2–3) || Allen (3) || 20,174 || 28–27
|-

|-  bgcolor="ffbbbb"
|- align="center" bgcolor="ffbbbb"
| 56 || June 1 || @ Indians || 6–4 || Atchison (2–0) || Ottavino (0–2) || || 16,682 || 28–28
|- align="center" bgcolor="ffbbbb"
| 57 || June 3 || Diamondbacks || 4–2 || Anderson (4–0) || de la Rosa (6–4) || Reed (15) || 29,682 || 28–29
|- align="center" bgcolor="ffbbbb"
| 58 || June 4 || Diamondbacks || 16–8 || Ziegler (2–1) || Brothers (2–4) || || 26,199 || 28–30
|- align="center" bgcolor="ffbbbb"
| 59 || June 5 || Diamondbacks || 12–7 || Arroyo (5–4) || Nicasio (5–4) || || 26,521 || 28–31
|- align="center" bgcolor="ffbbbb"
| 60 || June 6 || Dodgers || 7–2 || Ryu (7–2) || Butler (0–1) || || 39,203 || 28–32
|- align="center" bgcolor="bbffbb"
| 61 || June 7 || Dodgers || 5–4 (10) || Morales (4–4) || Perez (0–3) || || 40,474 || 29–32
|- align="center" bgcolor="ffbbbb"
| 62 || June 8 || Dodgers || 6–1 (6) || Kershaw (5–2) || de la Rosa (6–5) || || 38,111 || 29–33
|- align="center" bgcolor="ffbbbb"
| 63 || June 9 || Braves || 3–1 || Floyd (1–2) || Bergman (0–1) || Kimbrel (17) || 28,817 || 29–34
|- align="center" bgcolor="ffbbbb"
| 64 || June 10 || Braves || 13–10 || Hale (2–0) || Nicasio (5–5) || Kimbrel (18) || 27,875 || 29–35
|- align="center" bgcolor="bbffbb"
| 65 || June 11 || Braves || 8–2 || Matzek (1–0) || Teherán (6–4) || || 29,112 || 30–35
|- align="center" bgcolor="bbffbb"
| 66 || June 12 || Braves || 10–3 || Chacín (1–4) || Santana (5–3) || || 33,648 || 31–35
|- align="center" bgcolor="bbffbb"
| 67 || June 13 || @ Giants || 7–4 || Belisle (1–2) || Romo (3–2) || Hawkins (12) || 41,258 || 32–35
|- align="center" bgcolor="bbffbb"
| 68 || June 14 || @ Giants || 5–4 || Brothers (3–4) || Romo (3–3) || Hawkins (13) || 41,704 || 33–35
|- align="center" bgcolor="bbffbb"
| 69 || June 15 || @ Giants || 8–7 || Belisle (2–2) || Gutiérrez (1–2) || Hawkins (14) || 41,824 || 34–35
|- align="center" bgcolor="ffbbbb"
| 70 || June 16 || @ Dodgers || 6–1 || Ryu (8–3) || Matzek (1–1) || || 44,077 || 34–36
|- align="center" bgcolor="ffbbbb"
| 71 || June 17 || @ Dodgers || 4–2 || Greinke (9–3) || Chacín (1–5) || Jansen (20) || 44,175 || 34–37
|- align="center" bgcolor="ffbbbb"
| 72 || June 18 || @ Dodgers || 8–0 || Kershaw (7–2) || de la Rosa (6–6) || || 46,069 || 34–38
|- align="center" bgcolor="ffbbbb"
| 73 || June 20 || Brewers || 13–10 || Estrada (6–4) || Bergman (0–2) || Rodríguez (24) || 41,238 || 34–39
|- align="center" bgcolor="ffbbbb"
| 74 || June 21 || Brewers || 9–4 || Peralta (8–5) || Friedrich (0–1) || || 38,020 || 34–40
|- align="center" bgcolor="ffbbbb"
| 75 || June 22 || Brewers || 6–5 || Lohse (9–2) || Matzek (1–2) || Rodríguez (25) || 36,619 || 34–41
|- align="center" bgcolor="ffbbbb"
| 76 || June 23 || Cardinals || 8–0 || Lynn (8–5) || Chacín (1–6) || || 37,078 || 34–42
|- align="center" bgcolor="bbffbb"
| 77 || June 24 || Cardinals || 10–5 || de la Rosa (7–6) || Greenwood (1–1) || || 34,554 || 35–42
|- align="center" bgcolor="ffbbbb"
| 78 || June 25 || Cardinals || 9–6 || Neshek (2–0) || Ottavino (0–3) || Rosenthal (23) || 34,635 || 35–43
|- align="center" bgcolor="ffbbbb"
| 79 || June 26 || @ Brewers || 7–4 || Peralta (9–5) || Friedrich (0–2) || Rodríguez (26) || 27,056 || 35–44
|- align="center" bgcolor="ffbbbb"
| 80 || June 27 || @ Brewers || 3–2 || Rodríguez (3–2) || Belisle (2–3) || || 34,132 || 35–45
|- align="center" bgcolor="ffbbbb"
| 81 || June 28 || @ Brewers || 7–4 || Garza (5–5) || Chacín (1–7) || Rodríguez (27) || 40,816 || 35–46
|- align="center" bgcolor="bbffbb"
| 82 || June 29 || @ Brewers || 10–4 || de la Rosa (8–6) || Gallardo (5–5) || || 43,656 || 36–46
|- align="center" bgcolor="ffbbbb"
| 83 || June 30 || @ Nationals || 7–3 || Zimmermann (6–4) || Flande (0–1) || || 33,660 || 36–47
|-

|-  bgcolor="ffbbbb"
|- align="center" bgcolor="ffbbbb"
| 84 || July 1 || @ Nationals || 7–1 || Strasburg (7–6) || Friedrich (0–3) || || 26,033 || 36–48
|- align="center" bgcolor="ffbbbb"
| 85 || July 2 || @ Nationals || 4–3 || Fister (7–2) || Belisle (2–4) || Soriano (20) || 28,943 || 36–49
|- align="center" bgcolor="ffbbbb"
| 86 || July 3 || Dodgers || 3–2 || Greinke (11–4) || Hawkins (2–2) || Jansen (26) || 48,533 || 36–50
|- align="center" bgcolor="ffbbbb"
| 87 || July 4 || Dodgers || 9–0 || Kershaw (10–2) || Jurrjens (0–1) || || 48,815 || 36–51
|- align="center" bgcolor="bbffbb"
| 88 || July 5 || Dodgers || 8–7 || de la Rosa (9–6) || Haren (8–5) || Hawkins (15) || 32,926 || 37–51
|- align="center" bgcolor="ffbbbb"
| 89 || July 6 || Dodgers || 8–2 || Beckett (6–5) || Flande (0–2) || || 33,924 || 37–52
|- align="center" bgcolor="ffbbbb"
| 90 || July 7 || Padres || 6–1 || Kennedy (7–9) || Matzek (1–3) || || 26,782 || 37–53
|- align="center" bgcolor="bbffbb"
| 91 || July 8 || Padres || 2–1 || Morales (5–4) || Ross (7–9) || Hawkins (16) || 27,601 || 38–53
|- align="center" bgcolor="bbffbb"
| 92 || July 9 || Padres || 6–3 || Logan (2–1) || Benoit (3–1) || Hawkins (17) || 26,212 || 39–53
|- align="center" bgcolor="bbffbb"
| 93 || July 11 || Twins || 6–2 || de la Rosa (10–6) || Johnson (0–1) || || 36,110 || 40–53
|- align="center" bgcolor="ffbbbb"
| 94 || July 12 || Twins || 9–3 || Correia (5–11) || Matzek (1–4) || || 35,930 || 40–54
|- align="center" bgcolor="ffbbbb"
| 95 || July 13 || Twins || 13–5 || Hughes (10–5) || Anderson (0–3) || || 35,743 || 40–55
|- align="center" bgcolor="ffbbbb"
| 96 || July 18 || @ Pirates || 4–2 || Watson (6–1) || Belisle (2–5) || Melancon (17) || 37,833 || 40–56
|- align="center" bgcolor="ffbbbb"
| 97 || July 19 || @ Pirates || 3–2 (11) || Hughes (5–2) || Bettis (0–2) || || 37,396 || 40–57
|- align="center" bgcolor="ffbbbb"
| 98 || July 20 || @ Pirates || 5–3 || Gómez (2–2) || Belisle (2–6) || Melancon (18) || 35,609 || 40–58
|- align="center" bgcolor="ffbbbb"
| 99 || July 21 || Nationals || 7–2 || Fister (9–2) || Morales (5–5) ||  || 33,082 || 40–59
|- align="center" bgcolor="ffbbbb"
| 100 || July 22 || Nationals || 7–4 || Stammen (1–4) || Brown (0–1) || Soriano (23) || 36,874 || 40–60
|- align="center" bgcolor="bbffbb"
| 101 || July 23 || Nationals || 6–4 || de la Rosa (11–6) || Strasburg (7–8) || || 30,728 || 41–60
|- align="center" bgcolor="bbffbb"
| 102 || July 25 || Pirates || 8–1 || Anderson (1–3) || Morton (5–10) || || 34,487 || 42–60
|- align="center" bgcolor="bbffbb"
| 103 || July 26 || Pirates || 8–1 || Matzek (2–4) || Locke (2–2) || || 44,611 || 43–60
|- align="center" bgcolor="ffbbbb"
| 104 || July 27 || Pirates || 7–5 || Watson (7–1) || Brothers (3–5) || Melancon (19) || 40,382 || 43–61
|- align="center" bgcolor="ffbbbb"
| 105 || July 28 || @ Cubs || 4–1 || Wada (1–1) || Flande (0–3) || Rondón (13) || 29,702 || 43–62
|- align="center" bgcolor="ffbbbb"
| 106 || July 29 || @ Cubs || 4–3 (16) || Baker (1–0) || Matzek (2–5) || || 28,590 || 43–63
|- align="center" bgcolor="bbffbb"
| 107 || July 30 || @ Cubs || 6–4 (10) || Scahill (1–0) || Wright (0–2) || Ottavino (1) || 29,491 || 44–63
|- align="center" bgcolor="ffbbbb"
| 108 || July 31 || @ Cubs || 3–1 || Arrieta (6–2) || Hernández (0–1) || Rondón (14) || 35,729 || 44–64
|-

|-  bgcolor="ffbbbb"
|- align="center" bgcolor="ffbbbb"
| 109 || August 1 || @ Tigers || 4–2 || Verlander (10–9) || Morales (5–6) || Nathan (22) || 39,052 || 44–65
|- align="center" bgcolor="ffbbbb"
| 110 || August 2 || @ Tigers || 11–5 || Porcello (13–5) || Matzek (2–6) || || 42,811 || 44–66
|- align="center" bgcolor="ffbbbb"
| 111 || August 3 || @ Tigers || 4–0 || Sánchez (8–5) || de la Rosa (11–7) || || 41,487 || 44–67
|- align="center" bgcolor="ffbbbb"
| 112 || August 5 || Cubs || 6–5 (12) || Rondón (3–3) || Logan (2–2) || Villanueva (2) || 35,043 || 44–68
|- align="center" bgcolor="bbffbb"
| 113 || August 6 || Cubs || 13–4 || Lyles (6–1) || Arrieta (6–3) || || 35,804 || 45–68
|- align="center" bgcolor="ffbbbb"
| 114 || August 7 || Cubs || 6–2 || Hendricks (3–1) || Flande (0–4) || || 32,585 || 45–69
|- align="center" bgcolor="ffbbbb"
| 115 || August 8 || @ Diamondbacks || 5–3 || Anderson (7–4) || Matzek (2–7) || || 21,782 || 45–70
|- align="center" bgcolor="ffbbbb"
| 116 || August 9 || @ Diamondbacks || 14–4 || Cahill (2–8) || de la Rosa (11–8) || || 24,993 || 45–71
|- align="center" bgcolor="bbffbb"
| 117 || August 10 || @ Diamondbacks || 5–3 (10) || Belisle (3–6) || Pérez (2–2) || Hawkins (18) || 22,104 || 46–71
|- align="center" bgcolor="ffbbbb"
| 118 || August 11 || @ Padres || 4–3 || Vincent (1–2) || Logan (2–3) || Benoit (6) || 28,591 || 46–72
|- align="center" bgcolor="ffbbbb"
| 119 || August 12 || @ Padres || 4–1 || Despaigne (3–3) || Flande (0–5) || || 27,188 || 46–73
|- align="center" bgcolor="ffbbbb"
| 120 || August 13 || @ Padres || 5–3 || Kennedy (9–10) || Matzek (2–8) || Benoit (7) || 23,902 || 46–74
|- align="center" bgcolor="bbffbb"
| 121 || August 14 || Reds || 7–3 || de la Rosa (12–8) || Simón (12–8) || || 32,538 || 47–74
|- align="center" bgcolor="ffbbbb"
| 122 || August 15 || Reds || 3–2 || Cueto (15–6) || Ottavino (0–4) || Chapman (26) || 33,668 || 47–75
|- align="center" bgcolor="bbbbbb"
| – || August 16 || Reds || colspan=6 | Postponed (water main break) Rescheduled for August 17
|- align="center" bgcolor="bbffbb"
| 123 || August 17 || Reds || 10–9 || Brothers (4–5) || Hoover (1–9) || || 42,310 || 48–75
|- align="center" bgcolor="bbffbb"
| 124 || August 17 || Reds || 10–5 || Ottavino (1–4) || Contreras (0–1) || || 33,604 || 49–75
|- align="center" bgcolor="ffbbbb"
| 125 || August 19 || Royals || 7–4 || Shields (12–6) || Matzek (2–9) || Holland (39) || 30,394 || 49–76
|- align="center" bgcolor="bbffbb"
| 126 || August 20 || Royals || 5–2 || de la Rosa (13–8) || Duffy (8–11) || Hawkins (19) || 28,834 || 50–76
|- align="center" bgcolor="ffbbbb"
| 127 || August 22 || Marlins || 13–5 || Álvarez (10–5) || Morales (5–7) || || 30,674 || 50–77
|- align="center" bgcolor="bbffbb"
| 128 || August 23 || Marlins || 5–4 (13) || Belisle (4–6) || Dyson (2–1) || || 31,109 || 51–77
|- align="center" bgcolor="bbffbb"
| 129 || August 24 || Marlins || 7–4 || Bergman (1–2) || Hand (2–6) || Hawkins (20) || 40,509 || 52–77
|- align="center" bgcolor="bbffbb"
| 130 || August 25 || @ Giants || 3–2 || Matzek (3–9) || Peavy (3–13) || Hawkins (21) || 41,052 || 53–77
|- align="center" bgcolor="ffbbbb"
| 131 || August 26 || @ Giants || 3–0 || Bumgarner (15–9) || de la Rosa (13–9) || || 41,050 || 53–78
|- align="center" bgcolor="ffbbbb"
| 132 || August 27 || @ Giants || 4–2 || Casilla (2–3) || Nicasio (5–6) || || 41,071 || 53–79
|- align="center" bgcolor="ffbbbb"
| 133 || August 28 || @ Giants || 4–1 || Petit (4–3) || Lyles (6–2) || Casilla (12) || 41,017 || 53–80
|- align="center" bgcolor="ffbbbb"
| 134 || August 29 || @ Diamondbacks || 5–2 || Ziegler (5–2) || Brothers (4–6) || Reed (31) || 22,585 || 53–81
|- align="center" bgcolor="bbffbb"
| 135 || August 30 || @ Diamondbacks || 2–0 || Matzek (4–9) || Nuño (2–9) || Hawkins (22) || 27,272 || 54–81
|- align="center" bgcolor="ffbbbb"
| 136 || August 31 || @ Diamondbacks || 6–2 || Anderson (8–6) || de la Rosa (13–10) || || 22,948 || 54–82
|-

|-  bgcolor="ffbbbb"
|- align="center" bgcolor="ffbbbb"
| 137 || September 1 || Giants || 4–2 || Affeldt (1–1) || Friedrich (0–1) || Casilla (2) || 36,468 || 54–83
|- align="center" bgcolor="bbffbb"
| 138 || September 1 || Giants || 10–9 || Hawkins (3–2) || Romo (5–4) || || 33,711 || 55–83
|- align="center" bgcolor="ffbbbb"
| 139 || September 2 || Giants || 12–7 || Kontos (4–0) || Belisle (4–7) || || 25,256 || 55–84
|- align="center" bgcolor="bbffbb"
| 140 || September 3 || Giants || 9–2 || Bergman (2–2) || Vogelsong (8–10) || || 23,122 || 56–84
|- align="center" bgcolor="bbffbb"
| 141 || September 5 || Padres || 3–0 || Matzek (5–9) || Stults (6–16) || || 24,586 || 57–84
|- align="center" bgcolor="bbffbb"
| 142 || September 6 || Padres || 7–6 (12) || Masset (2–0) || Hahn (7–4) || || 28,496 || 58–84
|- align="center" bgcolor="bbffbb"
| 143 || September 7 || Padres || 6–0 || Morales (6–7) || Ross (13–13) || || 26,102 || 59–84
|- align="center" bgcolor="ffbbbb"
| 144 || September 8 || @ Mets || 3–2 || Torres (7–5) || Hawkins (3–3) || || 21,710 || 59–85
|- align="center" bgcolor="ffbbbb"
| 145 || September 9 || @ Mets || 2–0 || deGrom (8–6) || Bergman (2–3) || Familia (5) || 21,035 || 59–86
|- align="center" bgcolor="ffbbbb"
| 146 || September 10 || @ Mets || 2–0 || Montero (1–3) || Matzek (5–10) || Mejía (25) || 21,260 || 59–87
|- align="center" bgcolor="ffbbbb"
| 147 || September 12 || @ Cardinals || 5–1 || Wainwright (18–9) || de la Rosa (13–11) || || 45,108 || 59–88
|- align="center" bgcolor="ffbbbb"
| 148 || September 13 || @ Cardinals || 5–4 || Miller (10–9) || Morales (6–8) || Neshek (6) || 45,552 || 59–89
|- align="center" bgcolor="ffbbbb"
| 149 || September 14 || @ Cardinals || 4–1 || Gonzales (3–2) || Lyles (6–3) || Rosenthal (44) || 44,598 || 59–90
|- align="center" bgcolor="ffbbbb"
| 150 || September 15 || Dodgers || 11–3 || Wright (5–4) || Bergman (2–4) || || 29,031 || 59–91
|- align="center" bgcolor="bbffbb"
| 151 || September 16 || Dodgers || 10–4 || Matzek (6–10) || Haren (13–11) || || 28,983 || 60–91
|- align="center" bgcolor="bbffbb"
| 152 || September 17 || Dodgers || 16–2 || de la Rosa (14–11) || Frías (0–1) || || 24,866 || 61–91
|- align="center" bgcolor="bbffbb"
| 153 || September 18 || Diamondbacks || 7–6 || Hawkins (4–3) || Reed (1–7) || || 23,775 || 62–91
|- align="center" bgcolor="bbffbb"
| 154 || September 19 || Diamondbacks || 15–3 || Lyles (7–3) || Anderson (9–7) || || 37,022 || 63–91
|- align="center" bgcolor="bbffbb"
| 155 || September 20 || Diamondbacks || 5–1 || Butler (1–1) || Cahill (3–12) || || 33,764 || 64–91
|- align="center" bgcolor="bbffbb"
| 156 || September 21 || Diamondbacks || 8–3 || Bergman (3–4) || Miley (8–12) || || 29,036 || 65–91
|- align="center" bgcolor="ffbbbb"
| 157 || September 22 || @ Padres || 1–0 || Stults (8–17) || Matzek (6–11) || Quackenbush (6) || 19,770 || 65–92
|- align="center" bgcolor="bbffbb"
| 158 || September 23 || @ Padres || 3–2 || Nicasio (6–6) || Thayer (4–4) || Hawkins (23) || 33,669 || 66–92
|- align="center" bgcolor="ffbbbb"
| 159 || September 24 || @ Padres || 4–3 || Wieland (1–0) || Flande (0–6) || Benoit (10) || 38,589 || 66–93
|- align="center" bgcolor="ffbbbb"
| 160 || September 26 || @ Dodgers || 7–4 || Elbert (1–0) || Lyles (7–4) || || 43,328 || 66–94
|- align="center" bgcolor="ffbbbb"
| 161 || September 27 || @ Dodgers || 6–5 (12) || Frías (1–1) || Morales (6–9) || || 46,631 || 66–95
|- align="center" bgcolor="ffbbbb"
| 162 || September 28 || @ Dodgers || 10–5 || Greinke (17–8) || Bergman (3–5) || || 48,278 || 66–96
|-

Player stats

Batting

Starters by position 
Note: Pos = Position; G = Games played; AB = At bats; H = Hits; Avg. = Batting average; HR = Home runs; RBI = Runs batted in

Note: Tulowitzki had a .340 average, but didn't meet the minimum at-bat requirements for a batting title.

Other batters 
Note: G = Games played; AB = At bats; H = Hits; Avg. = Batting average; HR = Home runs; RBI = Runs batted in

Pitching

Starting pitchers 
Note: G = Games pitched; IP = Innings pitched; W = Wins; L = Losses; ERA = Earned run average; SO = Strikeouts

Other pitchers 
Note: G = Games pitched; IP = Innings pitched; W = Wins; L = Losses; ERA = Earned run average; SO = Strikeouts

Relief pitchers 
Note: G = Games pitched; W = Wins; L = Losses; SV = Saves; ERA = Earned run average; SO = Strikeouts

Notes
On June 18, 2014, Clayton Kershaw of the Los Angeles Dodgers threw a no-hitter against the Rockies at Dodger Stadium.  The Dodgers beat the Rockies by a score of 8-0.
On July 29, 2014, the Chicago Cubs defeated the Rockies, 4-3, in 16-inning game at Wrigley Field that lasted 6 hours and 27 minutes.  Time-wise, it was the longest game in the history for both franchises.  Colorado's previous record was set in 2008 in a 6 hour-16 minute game against the San Diego Padres. The Cubs' previous record was set in 1982 in a 6-hour-10-minute game against the Dodgers.
On August 17, 2014, in the second game of a doubleheader, Michael Cuddyer hit for the cycle. In doing so, he became only the third player in Major League history—after Bob Watson and John Olerud—to hit for the cycle in both the American and National Leagues.  His previous cycle came in 2009 while playing for the Minnesota Twins.

Farm system

LEAGUE CHAMPIONS: Asheville

References

External links
2014 Colorado Rockies season at Baseball Reference
2014 Colorado Rockies season Official Site

Colorado Rockies seasons
Colorado Rockies
Colorado Rockies
2010s in Denver